Sargana is a Punjabi tribe. Main settlement of the tribe is in Rachnavi region.
Actually named as Rajput Sial Sargana (راجپوت سیال سرگانہ).
Rachnavi is the area between the Ravi and Chenab rivers so the people living in the delta and their language are also called Rachnavi. This tribe is mostly dominant in district Jhang and Khanewal in south Punjab. Sargana is one of 27 clans of Sial tribe which itself is a clan of Muslim Rajput tribe. In tehsil Kabirwala Distt. Khanewal, Sargana tribe is  largest in figure and owner of more than 12000 acres agricultural land. There is 6 big Mauzas are owned by them in five are Shia Muslims and one Bagar Sargana has Sunni Muslims. Bagar Sargana (باگڑ سرگانہ) is located at Multan-Jhang Road 4 km from Abdul Hakim M4 interchange.
Google location of Bagar Sargana (30▫34’48.05” N   72▫01’36.26” E   elev 146 m)

Punjabi tribes
Social groups of Pakistan